Sabha may refer to:

 Sabhā, arts society in India
 Lok Sabha, lower house of the Parliament of India
 Rajya Sabha, upper house of the Parliament of India

Geography 
 Sabha, Libya, city in Sabha District, Libya
 Sabha Airbase, Libyan Air Force base in Sabha
 Sabha Airport, an airport in Sabha
 Sabha University, a university in Sabha
 Battle of Sabha, a battle in Sabha during the First Libyan Civil War
 Sabha Governorate, former governorate of Libya
 Sabha District, one of the districts of Libya

Other 
 , lead ship of the Royal Bahraini Naval Service Fleet